Elim Aboriginal Mission was an Aboriginal mission in Queensland, Australia.

History
This mission was established in 1885 on the north shore at Cape Bedford near Cooktown in Queensland. While it initially flourished, Elim's future became grim and the people were relocated to Hope Vale. At the beginning of World War II the people were relocated to Woorabinda Aboriginal Mission.

Over the next 10 years approximately a quarter of the people relocated to Woorabinda from Hope Valley died. In 1949, the people returned home to a new site called Hope Vale. Hope Vale was the first community in Queensland to receive land under Deed Of Grant In Trust arrangements. The 1996 census population of Hope Vale was 671.

Further reading
 McIvor, Roy (2010). Cockatoo: My Life in Cape York. Stories and Art. Roy McIvor. Magabala Books. Broome, Western Australia. .
Pohlner, Howard, J. 1986. gangurru. Hopevale Mission Board, Milton, Queensland. 
Poland, Wilhelm. Loose leaves; reminiscences of a pioneer North Queensland Missionary. originally published as three booklets by The Mission Institute of Neuendettelsau, Bavaria, 1905–1912. Reprint: Lutheran Publishing House, Adelaide. 1988. 
Roth, W. E. 1897. The Queensland Aborigines. 3 Vols. Reprint: Facsimile Edition, Hesperian Press, Victoria Park, W.A., 1984. .
Sutton, Peter (ed). Languages of Cape York: Papers presented to a Symposium organised by the Australian Institute of Aboriginal Studies. Australian Institute of Aboriginal Studies, Canberra. (1976). .
Wynter, Jo and Hill, John. 1991. Cape York Peninsula: Pathways to Community Economic Development. The Final Report of The Community Economic Development Projects Cook Shire. Cook Shire Council.

Towns in Queensland
Aboriginal communities in Queensland
Australian Aboriginal missions
Far North Queensland
Queensland in World War II